Joyce McRoberts is an American politician who served in the Idaho Senate from the 22nd district from 1992 to 1995.

References

Living people
Republican Party Idaho state senators
Year of birth missing (living people)